The Brady Kids is an American animated television series and a spin-off based on the ABC live-action sitcom The Brady Bunch, produced by Filmation in association with Paramount Television. It aired on ABC from September 9, 1972, to October 6, 1973, and also spun off another Filmation series, Mission: Magic!, starring Rick Springfield.

Background
In 1972, with the live action sitcom The Brady Bunch preparing for the start of its fourth season, show creator and executive producer Sherwood Schwartz approached Filmation about the creation of an animated series featuring the Brady Kids. Filmation agreed, and Lou Schiemer and Norm Prescott (who would later develop Schwartz properties Gilligan's Planet and The New Adventures of Gilligan) headed up the project.

Characters
The original show's six children (Barry Williams, Maureen McCormick, Christopher Knight, Eve Plumb, Mike Lookinland and Susan Olsen) voiced their animated counterparts in the first season. As the series' title implies, the parents and Alice the housekeeper characters were omitted from the show. At the end of the first season, Filmation asked the kids to continue on their existing contracts for another five episodes in a second season. The kids' original answer was no, prodded on by their agent Harvey Shotz. Filmation threatened both to sue the children over breach of contract, and to continue the show without their voices. Lookinland, Plumb, and Olsen agreed to the extended Filmation contract, but Williams, Knight, and McCormick did not agree.

The Bradys
 Greg Brady: Barry Williams (season 1),  Lane Scheimer (season 2)
 Marcia Brady: Maureen McCormick (season 1), Erika Scheimer (season 2)
 Peter Brady: Christopher Knight (season 1), David E. Smith (season 2)
 Jan Brady:  Eve Plumb
 Bobby Brady:  Mike Lookinland
 Cindy Brady:  Susan Olsen

Other characters
 Marlon: Larry Storch
 Ping and Pong: Jane Webb
 Mop Top: Larry Storch
 Chuck White: Larry Storch
 Fleetwood: Larry Storch
 Babs: Jane Webb

Crossover with DC comics
 Superman
 Lois Lane
 Wonder Woman

Production
While Schwartz originally intended to hand off full editorial control to Schiemer and Prescott, he eventually returned to become an active part of production, reviewing scripts and advising on creative input.

Much of the animation for the series was copied over from another Filmation series, The Archie Show. Walk cycles, profile pictures, and scenes where the Brady kids play in a band were all frame-by-frame replacements for looped frames originally seen of The Archies on The Archie Show. Many of Mop Top's poses were copied from the Archies' character Hot Dog. Mop Top copied  Hot Dog's design  (from Archie) with the only difference being a pallette change. Fleetwood's poses and walk cycles were often copied from Rudy of Fat Albert and the Cosby Kids.

Originally aired as a one-hour segment on The ABC Saturday Superstar Movie, the pilot episode was split into two half-hour segments on The Brady Kids. A total of 22 episodes were produced. Season 1 aired Saturday mornings from 10:30 to 11:00 AM, and season 2 aired Saturday mornings from 11:00 to 11:30 AM. Season 1 contained 17 episodes, and season 2 contained 5. Season 2 was specifically created by Filmation with the intent on 5 episodes to bring the total count of episodes to 22, the minimum required for syndication. Like most 1970s-era Saturday morning cartoon series as well as The Brady Bunch show itself, The Brady Kids contained an adult laugh track.

The opening sequence featured the fourth season "grid" familiar to The Brady Bunch viewers, without the center column that is  normally occupied by the adults (Mike, Carol and Alice).  Near the end of the theme song (featuring new lyrics set to the original Brady Bunch theme with a 70's style beat), Marlon flies up and down the center, "magically" transforming the live-action children into their animated counterparts. Another intro features Marlon flying up and down the center of an empty blue background to reveal the Brady Kids.

Episodes

Series overview

Season 1 (1972)

Season 2 (1973)

Home media
In April 2007, the two-part episodes "Jungle Bungle" were released as bonus features on The Brady Bunch: The Complete Series 21-disc DVD set by CBS and Paramount.

CBS Home Entertainment released The Brady Kids: The Complete Animated Series on DVD in Region 1 in February 2016.

The complete series was re-released on DVD by CBS/Paramount in June 2019 as a part of The Brady-est Brady Bunch TV & Movie Collection to commemorate the 50th anniversary of the original series.

References

External links
 
 

1972 American television series debuts
1973 American television series endings
American children's animated comedy television series
American Broadcasting Company original programming
1970s American animated television series
American animated television spin-offs
The Brady Bunch
Television series by Filmation
Television series by CBS Studios
English-language television shows
Animated musical groups
Animated television series about children
Television shows directed by Hal Sutherland